Missanabie 62 is a First Nations reserve in Algoma District, Ontario. It is one of the reserves of the Michipicoten First Nation.

References

External links
 Canada Lands Survey System

Ojibwe reserves in Ontario
Communities in Algoma District